A. K. Sajan is an Indian screenwriter and film director who is best known for his directorial debut Stop Violence (2002). The film stars Prithviraj Sukumaran and Chandra Lakshman. He is also known for scripting many movies in the industry. His notable works include Dhruvam (1993), Butterflies (1993), Kashmeeram (1994), Crime File (1999), Chinthamani Kolacase (2006), Nadiya Kollappetta Rathri (2007) and Puthiya Niyamam (2016). 
His brother A. K. Santhosh is also a scriptwriter and have scripted various movies like Sooryaputhran, Minnaminuginum Minnukettu and a Tamil - Malayalam bilingual movie Vande Matharam.

Career
Began his film career as a story writer for some movies in late 1980s. In the early 1990 he pitched the story idea of Dhruvam (1993), and began to pen the script. By mid 1991 with the completed draft he approached Joshiy, and the film started to roll. His next movie Butterflies (1993 film) with Mohanlal also turned out to be a blockbuster. In 1994, Kashmeeram (1994) with Suresh Gopi in the lead emerged as a super hit which reaffirmed stardom for Suresh Gopi. From there on, they both established as a pair and later worked on several films together. Their notable films were Kashmeeram (1994),Crime File (1999), Chinthamani Kolacase (2006) and Nadiya Kollappetta Rathri (2007). His directorial debut was in 2002 with the movie Stop Violence starring Prithviraj Sukumaran in the lead. The movie depicted the life of dark underworld prevailed in the city of Kochi. upon its release it garnered critical acclaim for its bold and realistic approach in making.

Filmography

References

External links
 

Malayalam screenwriters
Malayalam film directors
Living people
21st-century Indian film directors
Year of birth missing (living people)